Marina de Escobar (8 February 1554 – 9 June 1633) was a Spanish nun, and foundress of a modified branch of the Brigittine Order.  She was born and died in Valladolid, Spain.

Life
Marie's father, Iago de Escobar, was professor of civil and canon law and for a time governor of Osuna; her mother was Margaret Montana, daughter of the Emperor Charles V's physician.

Until her forty-fifth year Marie's attention was given mainly to her own perfection, then she devoted herself more to others. After 1603 she was permanently bedridden following an accident. Her spiritual guide was Luis de Ponte.

She established a branch of the Order of the Holy Saviour or Brigittines but with the rules greatly modified. By divine command, as she believed, she wrote her revelations, and when too feeble she dictated them, Luis de Ponte arranged them and left them for publication after her death. In his preface he declares his belief in their genuineness.

Works
The writings were published in one large volume and are divided into six books containing Luis de Ponte's remarks and her own, interspersed between the visions themselves. Book I treats of the means by which God had led her; II contains revelations about the mysteries of redemption; III about God and the Blessed Trinity; IV about guardian angels and the Blessed Virgin Mary's prerogatives; V gives means to help souls in purgatory and to save souls on earth; and VI reveals her perfection as shown under terrible sufferings.

The style of the work is free and flowing and she speaks with simplicity and naïve frankness. The visions are picturesque, and pleasing or alarming according to their subject, but the descriptions are mere outlines, leaving much to the imagination, and never going into details. Their variety is great, including: Daily communion and Satan's objection to it; mystic espousals; how the bodies of saints can appear in visions; internal stigmata; some saints with whom modern hagiographers have dealt harshly, as St. Christopher.

Biography
Her life, so far as de Ponte had written it, was published at Madrid in 1664; the second part appeared there in 1673. It was translated into Latin by M. Hanel, S.J., and published again at Prague in 1672–1688, and in an enlarged edition at Naples 1690. All these editions are now very rare. A German translation in four volumes, appeared in 1861.

References

1554 births
1633 deaths
16th-century Spanish nuns
17th-century Spanish nuns
Venerated Catholics
17th-century venerated Christians
People from Valladolid